In the former Soviet Union, self-taxation (samooblozhenie) was a form of collecting various resources (money, food, etc.) in rural areas for local needs. Described as voluntary, it was established at a common meeting of the residents of an administrative unit (settlement or selsoviet). The common annual rate was set over the unit, with the rate for independent farmers had to be at least 25% higher than for kolkhozniks, sovkhozniks, and factory and state workers. It was regulated by several  joint decrees of the Central Executive Committee and Sovnarkom of the Soviet Union with the same title, "On the Self-Taxation of Rural Population" ("О самообложении сельского населения") dated by August 16, 1930, August 1, 1931 and September 11, 1937. and later by other central governmental organs, such as Presidium Supreme Soviet (1984)

References

Taxation in the Soviet Union
Abolished taxes